SS Orsova was a steam ocean liner owned by the Orient Steam Navigation Company. She was built by John Brown & Company at Clydebank, Scotland in 1909 to operate a passenger service between London and Australia (via the Suez Canal). Her maiden voyage was 25 June 1909.

By 1913 Orsova was equipped for wireless telegraphy, operating on the 300 and 600 metre wavelengths. Her call sign was MOF.

On one of her voyages in 1914 her passengers included the Polish scientist Bronisław Malinowski and Polish artist, playwright and philosopher Stanisław Ignacy Witkiewicz. Witkiewicz travelled to Ceylon as an intended cure for his psyche after the suicide of his fiancée, Jadwiga Janczewska.

Requisitioned as a troop ship in 1915. On 14 March 1917, she was damaged by a mine laid by German submarine  and beached in Cornwall, but was repaired in Devonport and resumed the passenger service on the UK to Australia route in 1919.

Her last voyage was on 20 June 1936, and she was broken up at Bo'ness, Scotland.

References

Bibliography

External links
 

1908 ships
Maritime incidents in 1917
Ocean liners of the United Kingdom
Ships built on the River Clyde
Ships of the Orient Line
Steamships of the United Kingdom
Troop ships of the United Kingdom
World War I passenger ships of the United Kingdom